The Hotel Bethlehem is a 125-room hotel located in Bethlehem, Pennsylvania. The hotel, which was built in 1922, is a member of the Historic Hotels of America and was built in a Beaux Arts style. It is listed on the National Register of Historic Places as part of the Central Bethlehem Historic District, which includes 165 contributing buildings. It replaced a hotel that was converted from a general store in 1822.

History

19th century
Hotel Bethlehem replaced a hotel that opened in 1822 in a building formerly housing the 1794 general store, and was known as The Golden Eagle, later The Eagle, after a mural by Peter Grosh on the facade. This first hotel was remodeled in the 1870s but in 1920 was demolished for replacement with a more modern and more fireproof structure. The Bethlehem Hotel Corporation built the new Bethlehem Hotel starting in 1921 with funding from Charles M. Schwab and others at Bethlehem Steel, and it was opened in 1922. The Pioneer Tap Room is decorated with 1937 murals on the history of Bethlehem by military artist George Gray, which were part of a series commissioned by General J. Leslie Kincaid.

20th century
On January 29, 1989, there was a major fire on the fourth floor. A guest plugged her traveling iron in, causing a large flash from the outlet that quickly caught fire. She called the hotel lobby, and the front desk staff attempted to put it out with a hose, but the fire raged out of control, spreading to the fifth floor. The fire department ultimately extinguished the fire, but four people died and 14 were injured. At the time, the hotel was filled with 20 judges and police officers in Bethlehem for a convention and a college music competition that brought in guests and their families. 

The former solarium, now a restaurant, has original Moravian tile. 

After the closure of Bethlehem Steel in the 1990s, the hotel stood vacant and there were plans to convert it into a combination of facilities for the elderly and a women's dormitory for Moravian College. A group of local investors bought it and renovated it extensively in the late 1990s. In 2019 the Bethlehem Hotel came third in the USA Today 10 Best Historic Hotels poll.

References

Further reading
 

Hotels in Pennsylvania
Bethlehem, Pennsylvania
Hotels established in 1922
Hotel buildings completed in 1922
Historic Hotels of America